Hojatoleslam Hassan Sane'i is a governmental official of Iran who is a member of the Expediency Discernment Council. He is also the president of the 15 Khordad Foundation, a quasi-governmental foundation that was created in 1981.

Sane'i is a fundamentalist who has called for the execution of Salman Rushdie and raised the bounty of the head of the latter for insulting Islam.

He is brother of the reformist Grand Ayatollah Yousef Saanei.

References and notes

External links 
 The World Outraged by Prize Hike to Kill Rushdie 12 February 1997

Iranian Islamists
Iranian Islamic religious leaders
Shia Islamists
Living people
Members of the Expediency Discernment Council
Association of Combatant Clerics politicians
1934 births